Archdiocese of Beirut or Archeparchy of Beirut may refer to:

 Greek Orthodox Archdiocese of Beirut, an Eastern Orthodox archdiocese, centered in Beirut
 Syriac Orthodox Archdiocese of Beirut, an Oriental Orthodox archdiocese, centered in Beirut
 Armenian Catholic Archdiocese of Beirut, an Armenian Catholic archdiocese, centered in Beirut
 Greek Catholic Archdiocese of Beirut, a Greek Catholic archdiocese, centered in Beirut
 Maronite Catholic Archdiocese of Beirut, a Maronite Catholic archdiocese, centered in Beirut

See also 
 Archbishop of Beirut (disambiguation)
 Diocese of Beirut (disambiguation)
 Christianity in Lebanon